Cranfills Gap Independent School District is a public school district based in Cranfills Gap, Texas (USA).

Located in Bosque County, a portion of the district extends into Hamilton County.

Cranfills Gap ISD has one school that serves students in grades pre-kindergarten through twelve.

School
 Cranfills Gap School - PreK-12 Grade School that serves the entire CGISD.

Academic achievement
In 2009, the school district was rated "recognized" by the Texas Education Agency.

Special programs

Athletics
Cranfills Gap High School plays six-man football.  At a mere 24 students it is the smallest public school playing football in Texas.

See also

List of school districts in Texas 
List of high schools in Texas

References

External links

School districts in Bosque County, Texas
School districts in Hamilton County, Texas